Alclometasone is a synthetic corticosteroid for topical dermatologic use, possessing anti-inflammatory, antipruritic, and vasoconstrictive properties.

The prodrug alclometasone dipropionate was originally marketed under the brand name Aclovate by GlaxoSmithKline as a topical cream and ointment. However, generic versions of the drug are available.

Medical uses
Alclometasone cream and ointment are indicated for the relief of corticosteroid-responsive dermatoses, including:
 atopic dermatitis
 eczema
 psoriasis
 allergic dermatitis
 contact dermatitis
 actinic dermatitis
 kiss-type allergy
 skin itch

Alclometasone may be used on sensitive skin sites (face, skinfolds); in pediatric patients 1 year or older and in geriatric patients.

Contraindications
 hypersensitivity to alclometasone or any of ingredients in pharmaceutical forms
 cutaneous tuberculosis
 chicken pox
 perioral dermatitis
 acne
 rosacea
 open wounds
 trophic ulcers
 viral infection of skin
 skin manifestations of syphilis

Side effects
Adverse reactions (sometimes, less than 1-2% cases) include:
 burning
 itching
 erythema
 skin reddening
 xerodermia
 skin irritation
 acne
 hypopigmentation
 prickly heat
 folliculitis
 white atrophy
 hypertrichosis
 reinfection of skin

Pharmacology
Alclometasone induces the production of lipocortins, formally known as annexins, which inhibit phospholipase A2 – the enzyme responsible for the synthesis of arachidonic acid. Without the oxidation of arachidonic acid, eicosanoids, such as prostaglandins, thromboxanes, and leukotrienes, can't be produced.

Alclometasone also inhibits the release of pro-inflammatory mediators from leukocytes (e.g., cytokines, histamine, leukotrienes, serotonin).

Formulations
Alclometasone as Aclovate is supplied in:
 Cream; Topical; 0.05%
 Ointment; Topical; 0.05%

References

Glucocorticoids
Organochlorides